Uchechukwu Deborah ukeh (born 12 November 1996) is a Nigerian badminton player. In 2014, she competed at the African Youth Games, and won two gold medals in the girls' doubles and mixed team event. In 2016, she was the women's singles runner-up at the Ivory Coast International, and won the mixed doubles title partnered with Gideon Babalola. In 2017, she and Babalola reach the final round at the Ivory Coast International, but finished in second place. Ukeh also the runner-up at the Benin International tournament in the women's singles and doubles event. In the national event, Ukeh who represented Edo State was the women's singles and doubles runner-up at the Katsina Golden Star Badminton Championships.

Achievements

African Games 
Women's doubles

African Championships 
Women's doubles

African Youth Games 
Girls' doubles

Mixed doubles

BWF International Challenge/Series (2 titles, 5 runners-up) 
Women's singles

Women's doubles

Mixed doubles

  BWF International Challenge tournament
  BWF International Series tournament
  BWF Future Series tournament

References

External links 
 

1996 births
Living people
Sportspeople from Edo State
Nigerian female badminton players
Competitors at the 2015 African Games
Competitors at the 2019 African Games
African Games gold medalists for Nigeria
African Games silver medalists for Nigeria
African Games bronze medalists for Nigeria
African Games medalists in badminton
21st-century Nigerian women